Lavrenty Kartvelishvili (28 April 1890 – 22 August 1938) was a Georgian Bolshevik revolutionary and Soviet politician who served as the First Secretary of the Georgian Communist Party from 11 September to 14 November 1931.

Biography 

A son of a peasant, he was born on 16 (28) April 1890 in the village of Yaneti in Tiflis province. Involved in the revolutionary movement since 1905, he was a member of the Russian Social Democratic Labour Party since 1910. In 1911 he studied at the Kiev Commercial Institute, which he graduated in 1914.

During the October Revolution he was in Kiev and became one of the organizers of the struggle for Soviet power in Ukraine. He was chairman of the regional committee of the RSDLP  in Kiev, member of the revolutionary and underground district and city committee of the CP in Odessa. In 1919–1920, he was first secretary and then head of the organizational department of the CP District Committee in Odessa.

He was First Secretary of the Central Committee of the Communist Party (Bolshevik Party) of Georgia in 1923–1928, chairman of the Central Executive Committee of the Georgian SSR in 1927–1928, and chairman of the Council of People's Commissars of the Georgian SSR in 1927–1929. From 11 September to 14 November 1931, he was First Secretary of the Georgian Communist Party.

After being replaced in Georgia by his political adversary Lavrentiy Beria, he became between 1931 and 1933 First secretary of the National Committee of the All-Union Communist Party in Western Siberia, and between 1933 and 1936 in the Far East. From 28 December 1936 to 14 July 1937, he was First Secretary of the District Committee of the CPSU in the Crimea.

On 29 June 1937, he was arrested by the NKVD at the request of Pavel Postyshev, accused of espionage for Germany, Japan, Great Britain and other foreign powers, participation in a conspiracy to overthrow Soviet power and the murder of Stalin, Yezhov and other party and state leaders. Sentenced to death by the Military College of the Supreme Court of the USSR, he was executed in Kommunarka on 22 August 1938.

References

External links 
 Free Dictionary
 http://www.hrono.ru/biograf/bio_k/kvartveli.php (Russian)
 https://oval.ru/enc/88572.html (Russian)

1890 births
1938 deaths
People from Tbilisi
First Secretaries of the Georgian Communist Party
Deaths by firearm in Russia
Executed politicians
Great Purge victims from Georgia (country)
Heads of government of the Georgian Soviet Socialist Republic
Russian Social Democratic Labour Party members
Old Bolsheviks
Revolutionaries from Georgia (country)
First Secretaries of the Communist Party of the Transcaucasian SFSR